Saracen is a 1989 British television drama series. Made for ITV by Central Television, it starred Christian Burgess and Patrick James Clarke in the title roles. 13 episodes were made which were shown throughout the autumn of 1989.

Series history
The series was created by Ted Childs and Chris Kelly. In the pilot episode, the action concentrated on SAS Major David Barber (played by Stephen Hattersley) who resigns his commission after being forced to undertake a badly-planned hostage rescue. He was Headhunted by elite private security company Saracen Systems and is partnered up with an Australian ex-Army sergeant Jack Carne (John Walton). Saracen Systems, operated at home and abroad, usually Africa, but could only carry firearms  when on foreign missions.

This was a glossy, expensive film production, perhaps intended to bring back the success of previous ITV action drama like The Professionals.

Main cast

Christian Burgess as David Barber
Patrick James Clarke as Tom Duffy
Michael Byrne as Colonel Patrick Ansell
John Bennett as Nugent 
Ingrid Lacey as Alice

DVD release
Network released the full 13-part series on DVD as a 4-disc set on 7 June 2010.

References

External links
 Series review with photos and video at The Medium is Not Enough
 BFI.org
 https://www.imdb.com/title/tt0133315/

ITV television dramas
1989 British television series debuts
1989 British television series endings
1980s British drama television series
British action television series
Television series by ITV Studios
English-language television shows
Television shows produced by Central Independent Television